January 8 – December 20: 2015 BWF Schedule of Events

BWF Super Series

 March 3 – December 13: 2015 BWF Super Series
 March 3 – 8: 2015 All England Super Series Premier in  Birmingham
 Men's Singles:  Chen Long
 Men's Doubles:  Mathias Boe / Carsten Mogensen
 Women's Singles:  Carolina Marín
 Women's Doubles:  Bao Yixin / Tang Yuanting
 Mixed Doubles:  Zhang Nan / Zhao Yunlei
 March 24 – 29: 2015 India Super Series in  New Delhi
 Men's Singles:  Srikanth Kidambi
 Men's Doubles:  Chai Biao / Hong Wei
 Women's Singles:  Saina Nehwal
 Women's Doubles:  Misaki Matsutomo / Ayaka Takahashi
 Mixed Doubles:  Liu Cheng / Bao Yixin
 March 31 – April 5: 2015 Malaysia Super Series Premier in  Kuala Lumpur
 Men's Singles: Chen Long
 Men's Doubles:  Mohammad Ahsan / Hendra Setiawan
 Women's Singles: Carolina Marín
 Women's Doubles:  Luo Ying / Luo Yu
 Mixed Doubles:  Zhang Nan / Zhao Yunlei
 April 7 – 12: 2015 Singapore Super Series in 
 Men's Singles:  Kento Momota
 Men's Doubles:  Angga Pratama / Ricky Karanda Suwardi
 Women's Singles:  SUN Yu
 Women's Doubles:  OU Dongni / YU Xiaohan
 Mixed Doubles:  Zhang Nan / Zhao Yunlei
 May 26 – 31: 2015 Australian Super Series in  Sydney
 Men's Singles:  Chen Long
 Men's Doubles:  Lee Yong-dae / Yoo Yeon-seong
 Women's Singles:  Carolina Marín
 Women's Doubles:  Ma Jin / Tang Yuanting
 Mixed Doubles:  Lee Chun Hei / Chau Hoi Wah
 June 2 – 7: 2015 Indonesia Super Series Premier in  Jakarta
 Men's Singles:  Kento Momota
 Men's Doubles:  Ko Sung-hyun / Shin Baek-cheol
 Women's Singles:  Ratchanok Intanon
 Women's Doubles:  Tang Jinhua / Tian Qing
 Mixed Doubles:  Xu Chen / Ma Jin
 September 8 – 13: 2015 Japan Super Series in  Tokyo
 Men's Singles:  Lin Dan
 Men's Doubles:  Lee Yong-dae / Yoo Yeon-seong
 Women's Singles:  Nozomi Okuhara
 Women's Doubles:  Zhao Yunlei / Zhong Qianxin
 Mixed Doubles:  Joachim Fischer Nielsen / Christinna Pedersen
 September 15 – 20: 2015 Korea Open Super Series in  Seoul
 Men's Singles:  Chen Long
 Men's Doubles:  Lee Yong-dae / Yoo Yeon-seong
 Women's Singles:  Sung Ji-hyun
 Women's Doubles:  Nitya Krishinda Maheswari / Greysia Polii
 Mixed Doubles:  Zhang Nan / Zhao Yunlei 
 October 13 – 18: 2015 Denmark Super Series Premier in  Odense
 Men's Singles:  Chen Long
 Men's Doubles:  Lee Yong-dae / Yoo Yeon-seong
 Women's Singles:  Li Xuerui
 Women's Doubles:  Jung Kyung-eun / Shin Seung-chan
 Mixed Doubles:  Ko Sung-hyun / Kim Ha-na
 October 20 – 25: 2015 French Super Series in  Paris
 Men's Singles:  Lee Chong Wei
 Men's Doubles:  Lee Yong-dae / Yoo Yeon-seong
 Women's Singles:  Carolina Marín
 Women's Doubles:  HUANG Yaqiong / Tang Jinhua
 Mixed Doubles:  Ko Sung-hyun / Kim Ha-na
 November 10 – 15: 2015 China Open Super Series Premier in  Fuzhou
 Men's Singles:  Lee Chong Wei
 Men's Doubles:  Kim Gi-jung / Kim Sa-rang
 Women's Singles:  Li Xuerui
 Women's Doubles:  Tang Yuanting / Yu Yang
 Mixed Doubles:  Zhang Nan / Zhao Yunlei
 November 17 – 22: 2015 Hong Kong Super Series in  Kowloon
 Men's Singles:  Lee Chong Wei
 Men's Doubles:  Lee Yong-dae / Yoo Yeon-seong
 Women's Singles:  Carolina Marín
 Women's Doubles:  Tian Qing / Zhao Yunlei
 Mixed Doubles:  Zhang Nan / Zhao Yunlei
 December 9 – 13: 2015 BWF Super Series Masters Finals in  Dubai
 Men's Singles:  Kento Momota
 Men's Doubles:  Mohammad Ahsan / Hendra Setiawan
 Women's Singles:  Nozomi Okuhara
 Women's Doubles:  Luo Ying / Luo Yu
 Mixed Doubles:  Chris Adcock / Gabby Adcock

BWF Grand Prix Gold and Grand Prix

 January 13 – December 20: 2015 BWF Grand Prix Gold and Grand Prix
 January 13 – 18: 2015 Malaysia Open Grand Prix Gold in  Kuching
 Men's Singles:  Lee Hyun-il
 Men's Doubles:  Kenta Kazuno / Kazushi Yamada
 Women's Singles:  Nozomi Okuhara
 Women's Doubles:  Christinna Pedersen / Kamilla Rytter Juhl
 Mixed Doubles:  Joachim Fischer Nielsen / Christinna Pedersen
 January 20 – 25: 2015 India Open Grand Prix Gold in  Lucknow
 Men's Singles:  Parupalli Kashyap
 Men's Doubles:  Mathias Boe / Carsten Mogensen
 Women's Singles:  Saina Nehwal
 Women's Doubles:  Amelia Alicia Anscelly / Soong Fie Cho
 Mixed Doubles:  Riky Widianto / Richi Puspita Dili
 February 24 – March 1: 2015 German Open Grand Prix Gold in  Mülheim
 Men's Singles:  Jan Ø. Jørgensen
 Men's Doubles:  Mads Conrad-Petersen / Mads Pieler Kolding
 Women's Singles:  Sung Ji-hyun
 Women's Doubles:  Christinna Pedersen / Kamilla Rytter Juhl
 Mixed Doubles:  Mads Pieler Kolding / Kamilla Rytter Juhl	
 March 10 – 15: 2015 Swiss Open Grand Prix Gold in  Basel
 Men's Singles:  Srikanth Kidambi
 Men's Doubles:  Cai Yun / LU Kai
 Women's Singles:  SUN Yu
 Women's Doubles:  Bao Yixin / Tang Yuanting
 Mixed Doubles:  LU Kai / HUANG Yaqiong
 April 14 – 19: 2015 China Masters Grand Prix Gold (Bonny China Masters) in  Changzhou
 Men's Singles:  Wang Zhengming
 Men's Doubles:  LI Junhui / LIU Yuchen
 Women's Singles:  HE Bingjiao
 Women's Doubles:  Tang Jinhua / Zhong Qianxin
 Mixed Doubles:  LIU Cheng / Bao Yixin
 April 28 – May 3: 2015 New Zealand Open Grand Prix in  Auckland
 Men's Singles:  Lee Hyun-il
 Men's Doubles:  HUANG Kaixiang / ZHENG Siwei
 Women's Singles:  Saena Kawakami
 Women's Doubles:  Xia Huan / Zhong Qianxin
 Mixed Doubles:  ZHENG Siwei / CHEN Qingchen
 June 16 – 21: 2015 U.S. Open Grand Prix Gold in  New York City
 Men's Singles:  Lee Chong Wei
 Men's Doubles:  LI Junhui / LIU Yuchen
 Women's Singles:  Nozomi Okuhara
 Women's Doubles:  Yu Yang / Zhong Qianxin
 Mixed Doubles:  HUANG Kaixiang / HUANG Dongping
 June 23 – 28: 2015 Canada Open Grand Prix in  Calgary
 Men's Singles:  Lee Chong Wei
 Men's Doubles:  LI Junhui / LIU Yuchen
 Women's Singles:  Michelle Li
 Women's Doubles:  Jwala Gutta / Ashwini Ponnappa
 Mixed Doubles:  Lee Chun Hei / Chau Hoi Wah
 July 14 – 19: 2015 Chinese Taipei Open Grand Prix Gold in  Taipei
 Men's Singles:  Chen Long
 Men's Doubles:  Fu Haifeng / Zhang Nan
 Women's Singles:  Wang Yihan
 Women's Doubles:  Nitya Krishinda Maheswari / Greysia Polii
 Mixed Doubles:  Ko Sung-hyun / Kim Ha-na
 July 21 – 26: 2015 Russian Open in  Vladivostok
 Men's Singles:  Tommy Sugiarto
 Men's Doubles:  Vladimir Ivanov / Ivan Sozonov
 Women's Singles:  Kristína Gavnholt
 Women's Doubles:  Gabriela Stoeva / Stefani Stoeva
 Mixed Doubles:  Chan Peng Soon / Goh Liu Ying
 August 24 – 30: 2015 Vietnam Open Grand Prix in  Ho Chi Minh City
 Men's Singles:  Tommy Sugiarto
 Men's Doubles:  LI Junhui / LIU Yuchen
 Women's Singles:  Saena Kawakami
 Women's Doubles:  Jongkongphan Kittiharakul / Rawinda Prajongjai
 Mixed Doubles:  HUANG Kaixiang / HUANG Dongping
 September 29 – October 4: 2015 Thailand Open Grand Prix Gold in  Bangkok
 Men's Singles:  Lee Hyun-il
 Men's Doubles:  Wahyu Nayaka / Ade Yusuf
 Women's Singles:  Sung Ji-hyun
 Women's Doubles:  HUANG Dongping / LI Yinhui
 Mixed Doubles:  CHOI Sol-gyu / Eom Hye-won
 October 6 – 11: 2015 Dutch Open Grand Prix in  Almere
 Men's Singles:  Ajay Jayaram
 Men's Doubles:  Koo Kien Keat / Tan Boon Heong
 Women's Singles:  Kirsty Gilmour
 Women's Doubles:  Gabriela Stoeva / Stefani Stoeva
 Mixed Doubles:  Ronan Labar / Emilie Lefel 
 October 13 – 18: 2015 Chinese Taipei Masters Grand Prix in  Taipei
 Men's Singles:  Sony Dwi Kuncoro
 Men's Doubles:  Markus Fernaldi Gideon / Kevin Sanjaya Sukamuljo
 Women's Singles:  LEE Jang-mi
 Women's Doubles:  Anggia Shitta Awanda / Ni Ketut Mahadewi Istirani
 Mixed Doubles:  Ronald Alexander / Melati Daeva Oktaviani
 October 27 – November 1: 2015 Bitburger Open Grand Prix Gold in  Saarbrücken
 Men's Singles:  Angus Ng Ka Long
 Men's Doubles:  Mads Conrad-Petersen / Mads Pieler Kolding
 Women's Singles:  Akane Yamaguchi
 Women's Doubles:  Tang Yuanting / Yu Yang
 Mixed Doubles:  Robert Mateusiak / Nadieżda Zięba
 November 3 – 8: 2015 Korea Open Grand Prix Gold in  Jeonju
 Men's Singles:  LEE Dong-keun
 Men's Doubles:  Kim Gi-jung / Kim Sa-rang
 Women's Singles:  Sayaka Sato
 Women's Doubles:  Chang Ye-na / Lee So-hee
 Mixed Doubles:  Ko Sung-hyun / Kim Ha-na
 November 18 – 22: 2015 Scottish Open Grand Prix in  Glasgow
 Men's Singles:  Hans-Kristian Vittinghus
 Men's Doubles:  Michael Fuchs / Johannes Schöttler
 Women's Singles:  Line Kjaersfeldt
 Women's Doubles:  Yuki Fukushima / Sayaka Hirota
 Mixed Doubles:  Vitalij Durkin / Nina Vislova
 Men's Singles:  Lin Dan
 Men's Doubles:  Huang Kaixiang / Zheng Siwei
 Women's Singles:  Shen Yaying
 Women's Doubles:  Chen Qingchen / Jia Yifan
 Mixed Doubles:  Zheng Siwei / Chen Qingchen
 November 24 – 29: 2015 Macau Open Grand Prix Gold
 Men's Singles:  JEON Hyeok-jin
 Men's Doubles:  Ko Sung-hyun / Shin Baek-cheol
 Women's Singles:  P. V. Sindhu
 Women's Doubles:  Jung Kyung-eun / Shin Seung-chan
 Mixed Doubles:  Shin Baek-cheol / Chae Yoo-jung
 December 1 – 6: 2015 Indonesia Masters Grand Prix Gold  Malang
 Men's Singles:  Tommy Sugiarto
 Men's Doubles:  Berry Angriawan / Rian Agung Saputro
 Women's Singles:  HE Bingjiao
 Women's Doubles:  Tang Yuanting / Yu Yang
 Mixed Doubles:  Tontowi Ahmad / Liliyana Natsir
 December 7 – 12: 2015 K&D Graphics / Yonex Grand Prix in  Orange, California
 Men's Singles:  Lee Hyun-il
 Men's Doubles:  V Shem Goh / Wee Kiong Tan
 Women's Singles:  Pai Yu Po
 Women's Doubles:  Jung Kyung-eun / Shin Seung-chan
 Mixed Doubles:  Choi Sol-gyu / Eom Hye-won
 Men's Singles:  Lee Dong-keun
 Men's Doubles:  Manu Attri / B. Sumeeth Reddy
 Women's Singles:  Sayaka Sato
 Women's Doubles:  Shizuka Matsuo / Mami Naito
 Mixed Doubles:  Chan Peng Soon / Goh Liu Ying

Other badminton events

 February 12 – 15: 2015 European Mixed Team Badminton Championships in  Leuven
 Winners:  (Line Kjærsfeldt, Jan Ø. Jørgensen, Christinna Pedersen, Kamilla Rytter Juhl, Mads Conrad-Petersen, Mads Pieler Kolding, Joachim Fischer Nielsen)
 February 12 – 15: 2015 Oceania Badminton Championships in  Auckland
 Men's Singles:  Daniel Guda
 Men's Doubles:  Matthew Chau / Sawan Serasinghe
 Women's Singles:  Hsuan-yu Wendy Chen
 Women's Doubles:  Leanne Choo / Gronya Somerville
 Mixed Doubles:  Robin Middleton / Leanne Choo
 February 12 – 15: 2015 X-TRM Oceania Junior Championships in  Auckland
 Men's Junior Singles:  Oscar Guo
 Men's Junior Doubles:  Niccolo Tagle / Daxxon Vong
 Women's Junior Singles:  Alice Wu
 Women's Junior Doubles:  Lee-Yen KHOO / Alice Wu
 Mixed Junior Doubles:  Huaidong TANG / Lee-Yen KHOO
 March 26 – April 4: 2015 European Junior Badminton Championships in  Lubin
 Men's Junior Singles:  Anders Antonsen
 Men's Junior Doubles:  Alexander Bond / Joel Eipe
 Women's Junior Singles:  Mia Blichfeldt
 Women's Junior Doubles:  Julie Dawall Jakobsen / Ditte Søby Hansen
 Mixed Junior Doubles:  Max Weißkirchen / Eva Janssens
 April 21 – 26: 2015 Badminton Asia Championships in  Wuhan
 Men's Singles:  Lin Dan
 Men's Doubles:  Lee Yong-dae / Yoo Yeon-seong
 Women's Singles:  Ratchanok Intanon
 Women's Doubles:  Ma Jin / TANG Yuanting
 Mixed Doubles:  Tontowi Ahmad / Liliyana Natsir
 May 10 – 17: 2015 Sudirman Cup in  Dongguan
 Overall team winners:  (sixth consecutive Sudirman Cup titles; ten overall wins in total)
 June 10 – 14: 2015 European Club Badminton Championships in  Tours
  Primorye Vladivostok defeated  Aix Universite CB, 3–1 in matches played, to win their fourth consecutive and sixth overall European Club Badminton Championships title. 
 June 28 – July 5: 2015 BAC Junior Asian Championships in  Bangkok
 Men's Junior Singles:  LIN Guipu
 Men's Junior Doubles:   HE Jiting / ZHENG Siwei
 Women's Junior Singles:  HE Bingjiao
 Women's Junior Doubles:  DU Yue / LI Yinhui
 Mixed Junior Doubles:  ZHENG Siwei / CHEN Qingchen
 Mixed Junior Team: 
 August 2 – 9: 2015 Pan Am Junior Badminton Championships in  Tijuana
 Men's Junior Singles:  Jason Anthony Ho-Shue
 Men's Junior Doubles:  Jason Anthony Ho-Shue / Jonathan Bing Tsan Lai
 Women's Junior Singles:  OUYANG Qingzi
 Women's Junior Doubles:  Annie Xu / Kerry Xu
 Mixed Junior Doubles:  Jason Anthony Ho-Shue / OUYANG Qingzi
 Mixed Junior Team: 
 August 10 – 16: 2015 BWF World Championships in  Jakarta
 Men's Singles:  Chen Long
 Men's Doubles:  Mohammad Ahsan / Hendra Setiawan
 Women's Singles:  Carolina Marín
 Women's Doubles:  Tian Qing / Zhao Yunlei
 Mixed Doubles:  Zhang Nan / Zhao Yunlei
 September 8 – 13: 2015 Para-Badminton World Championships in  Stoke Mandeville
 For results, click here.
 Website, click here.
 September 20 – 26: 2015 BWF World Senior Championships in  Helsingborg
 For detailed results, click here.
 November 4 – 15: 2015 BWF World Junior Championships in  Lima
 Men's Singles:  Chia Hung Lu
 Men's Doubles:  HE Jiting / ZHENG Siwei
 Women's Singles:  Jin Wei Goh
 Women's Doubles:  CHEN Qingchen / JIA Yifan
 Mixed Doubles:  ZHENG Siwei / CHEN Qingchen

Minor badminton events

January BMT

 January 6–11: Granular Thailand International Challenge 2015 in  Bangkok
 Men's singles:  Lee Hyun-il
 Men's doubles:  Chan Jun Bong/Duck Young Kim
 Women's singles:  Supanida Katethong
 Women's doubles:  Duanganong Aroonkesorn/Kunchala Voravichitchaikul
 Mixed doubles:  Choi Sol-kyu/Chae Yoo-jung
 January 8–11: Estonian International 2015 in  Tallinn
 Men's singles:  Anton Kaisti
 Men's doubles:  Laurent Constantin/Matthieu Lo Ying Ping
 Women's singles:  Olga Golovanova
 Women's doubles:  Victoria Dergunova/Olga Morozova
 Mixed doubles:  Kasper Antonsen/Amanda Madsen
 January 15–18: Swedish Masters 2015 in  Uppsala
 Men's singles:  Rajiv Ouseph
 Men's doubles:  Anders Skaarup Rasmussen/Kim Astrup Sørensen
 Women's singles:  Kirsty Gilmour
 Women's doubles:  Anastasia Chervyakova/Nina Vislova
 Mixed doubles:  Jacco Arends/Selena Piek
 January 22–25: Iceland International 2015 in  Reykjavík
 Men's singles:  Milan Ludík
 Men's doubles:  Martin Campbell/Patrick MacHugh
 Women's singles:  Mette Poulsen
 Women's doubles:  Lena Grebak/Maria Helsbol
 Mixed doubles:  Nicklas Mathiasen/Cecilie Bjergen
 January 27 – February 1: China International Challenge 2015 in  Lingshui
 Men's singles:  Qiao Bin
 Men's doubles:  Wang Yilv/Wen Zhang
 Women's singles:  Nozomi Okuhara
 Women's doubles:  Ou Dongni/Xiaohan Yu
 Mixed doubles:  Zheng Si Wei/Chen Qingchen

February BMT

 February 12–15: Iran Fajr International Challenge 2015 in Tehran
 Men's singles:  David Obernosterer
 Men's doubles:  Tai An Khang/Hong Kheng Yew
 Women's singles:  Linda Zechiri
 Women's doubles:  Özge Bayrak/Neslihan Yiğit
 February 18–21: Austrian Open 2015 in Vienna
 Men's singles:  Ng Ka Long
 Men's doubles:  Fajar Alfian / Muhammad Rian Ardianto
 Women's singles:  Cheung Ngan Yi
 Women's doubles:  Suci Rizki Andini / Maretha Dea Giovani
 Mixed doubles:  Edi Subaktiar / Gloria Emanuelle Widjaja
 February 19–22: Uganda International 2015 in Lugogo
 Men's singles:  Jacob Maliekal
 Men's doubles:  Pavel Florián / Ondřej Kopřiva
 Women's singles:  Ebru Yazgan
 Women's doubles:  N. Siki Reddy / Poorvisha Ram S.
 Mixed doubles:  Tarun Kona / N. Siki Reddy
 February 19–22: I Peru International Series 2015 in Lima
 Men's singles:  Kevin Cordón
 Men's doubles:  Emre Vural / Sİnan Zorlu
 Women's singles: Cemre Fere
 Women's doubles:  Lohaynny Vicente / Luana Vicente
 Mixed doubles:  Mario Cuba / Katherine Winder

March BMT

 March 5 – 8: 50th Portuguese International Championships in Caldas da Rainha
 Men's singles:  Kazumasa Sakai
 Men's doubles:  Peter Briggs / Tom Wolfenden
 Women's singles:  Sayaka Takahashi
 Women's doubles:  Ayane Kurihara / Naru Shinoya
 Mixed doubles:  Filip Michael Duwall Myhren / Emma Wengberg
 March 11 – 15: 3rd Mercosul International 2015 in Foz do Iguaçu
 Men's singles:  Kevin Cordón
 Men's doubles:  Matijs Dierickx / Freek Golinski
 Women's singles:  Rong Schafer
 Women's doubles:  Özge Bayrak / Neslihan Yiğit
 Mixed doubles:  Phillip Chew / Jamie Subandhi
 March 12 – 15: Romanian International 2015 in Timișoara
 Men's singles:  Adi Pratama
 Men's doubles:  Zvonimir Đurkinjak / Zvonimir Hölbling
 Women's singles: Lianne Tan
 Women's doubles:  Chloe Birch / Jenny Wallwork
 Mixed doubles:  Tarun Kona / N. Siki Reddy
 March 17 – 22: Ciputra Hanoi - Yonex Sunrise Vietnam International Challenge 2015 in Hanoi
 Men's singles:  Firman Abdul Kholik
 Men's doubles:  Lu Ching-Yao / Chieh Tien Tzu
 Women's singles:  Kana Itō
 Women's doubles:  Anggia Shitta Awanda / Mahadewi Istirani Ni Ketut
 Mixed doubles:  Fran Kurniawan / Komala Dewi
 March 18 – 21: 41st Yonex Polish Open 2015 in Arłamów
 Men's singles:  Liew Daren
 Men's doubles:  Kenta Kazuno / Kazushi Yamada
 Women's singles:  Karin Schnaase
 Women's doubles:  Pradnya Gadre / N. Sikki Reddy
 Mixed doubles:  Chan Peng Soon / Goh Liu Ying
 March 19 – 22: Jamaica International Series 2015 in Kingston
 Men's singles:  Martin Giuffre
 Men's doubles:  Jonathan Solis / Rodolfo Ramírez
 Women's singles:  Ebru Tunalı
 Women's doubles:  Cemre Fere / Ebru Tunalı
 Mixed doubles:  Ramazan Özturk / Neslihan Kılıç
 March 25 – 29: XVI Giraldilla 2015 in Havana
 Men's singles:  Osleni Guerrero
 Men's doubles:  Giovanni Greco / Rosario Maddaloni
 Women's singles:  Ebru Tunali
 Women's doubles:  Cemre Fere / Ebru Tunalı
 Mixed doubles:  Mario Cuba / Katherine Winder
 March 26 – 29: Orleans International 2015 in Orléans
 Men's singles:  Dmytro Zavadsky
 Men's doubles:  Matthew Nottingham / Harley Towler
 Women's singles:  Natalia Koch Rohde
 Women's doubles:  Gabriela Stoeva / Stefani Stoeva
 Mixed doubles:  Mathias Christiansen / Lena Grebak

April BMT

 April 1 – 5: Osaka International Challenge 2015 in Osaka
 Men's singles:  Hyeok Jin-jeon
 Men's doubles:  Kenta Kazuno / Kazushi Yamada
 Women's singles:  Sayaka Takahashi
 Women's doubles:  CHEN Qingchen / JIA Yifan
 Mixed doubles:  KIM Duck-young / Eom Hye-won
 April 2 – 5: Finnish Open 2015 in Vantaa
 Men's singles:  Vladimir Vadimovich Malkov
 Men's doubles:  Andrew Ellis / Peter Mills
 Women's singles:  Beatriz Corrales
 Women's doubles:  Heather Olver / Lauren Smith
 Mixed doubles:  Anatoliy Yartsev / Evgeniya Kosetskaya 
 April 9 – 12: Victor Croatian International 2015 in Zagreb
 Men's singles:  Eric Pang
 Men's doubles:  Peter Briggs / Tom Wolfenden
 Women's singles:  Elena Komendrovskaja
 Women's doubles:  Maiken Fruergaard / Camilla Martens
 Mixed doubles:  Zvonimir Đurkinjak / Mateja Cica
 April 14 – 19: USM International Series 2015 in Semarang
 Men's singles:  Wisnu Yuli Prasetyo
 Men's doubles:  Fajar Alfian / Muhammad Rian Ardianto
 Women's singles:  Fitriani Fitriani
 Women's doubles:  Gebby Ristiyani Imawan / Tiara Rosalia Nuraidah
 Mixed doubles:  Irfan Fadhilah / Weni Anggraini
 April 16 – 19: 16th Victor Dutch International 2015 in Wateringen
 Men's singles:  Anders Antonsen
 Men's doubles:  Kasper Antonsen / Oliver Babic
 Women's singles:  Lianne Tan
 Women's doubles:  Gayle Mahulette / Cheryl Seinen
 Mixed doubles:  Amanda Madsen / Kasper Antonsen
 April 22 – 26: XX Peru International 2015 in Lima
 Men's singles:  Thomas Rouxel
 Men's doubles:  Adam Cwalina / Przemysław Wacha
 Women's singles:  Rong Schafer
 Women's doubles:  Delphine Lansac / Emilie Lefel
 Mixed doubles:  Ronan Labar / Emilie Lefel
 April 30 – May 3: Hellas International 2015 in Sidirokastro
 Men's singles:  Fabian Roth
 Men's doubles:  Milosz Bochat / Pawel Pietryja
 Women's singles:  Fontaine Mica Chapman
 Women's doubles:  Steffi Annys / Flore Vandenhoucke
 Mixed doubles:  Iiya Zdanov / Tatjana Bibik 
 April 30 – May 3: Chile International 2015 in Temuco
 Men's singles:  Osleni Guerrero
 Men's doubles:  Job Castillo / Lino Munoz
 Women's singles:  Laura Sarosi
 Women's doubles:  Lohaynny Vicente / Luana Vicente
 Mixed doubles:  Mario Cuba / Katherine Winder

May BMT

 May 5 – 10: Smiling Fish Thailand International Series 2015 in Trang, Thailand
 Men's singles:  André Marteen
 Men's doubles:  Wannawat Ampunsuwan / Tinn Isriyanate
 Women's singles:  Supanida Katethong
 Women's doubles:  Supanida Katethong / Panjarat Pransopon
 Mixed doubles:  Parinyawat Thongnuam / Phataimas Muenwong
 May 7 – 10: Slovenia International 2015 in Medvode
 Men's singles:  Dmytro Zavadsky
 Men's doubles:  Zvonimir Đurkinjak / Zvonimir Hölbling
 Women's singles:  Marija Ulitina
 Women's doubles:  Linda Efler / Lara Kaepplein 
 Mixed doubles:  Bastian Kersaudy / Lea Palermo 
 May 21 – 24: Trinidad & Tobago International 2015 in Saint Augustine, Trinidad and Tobago
 Men's singles:  Martin Giuffre
 Men's doubles:  Luis Ramon Garrido / Lino Munoz
 Women's singles:  Elisabeth Baldauf
 Women's doubles:  Haramara Gaitan / Sabrina Solis
 Mixed doubles:  David Obernosterer / Elisabeth Baldauf
 May 21 – 24: XXVIII Spanish International 2015 in Madrid
 Men's singles:  Pablo Abián
 Men's doubles:  Adam Cwalina / Przemysław Wacha
 Women's singles:  Iris Wang
 Women's doubles:  Gabriele Stoeva / Stefani Stoeva
 Mixed doubles:  Marvin Emil Seidel / Linda Efler

June BMT

 Note 1: There was a badminton event, from June 9 – 14, that was cancelled.
 Note 2: There was another badminton event, from June 18 – 21, that was cancelled as well.
 June 2 – 6: Sri Lanka International Challenge 2015 in Colombo
 Men's singles:  Sai Praneeth B.
 Men's doubles:  Koo Kien Keat / Boon Heong Tan
 Women's singles:  Supanida Katethong
 Women's doubles:  Chaladchalam Chayanit / Phataimas Muenwong
 Mixed doubles:  Arun Vishnu / Aparna Balan
 June 3 – 7: Santo Domingo Open 2015 in the Dominican Republic
 Men's singles:  David Obernosterer 
 Men's doubles:  Job Castillo / Lino Munoz
 Women's singles:  Elisabeth Baldauf 
 Women's doubles:  Katherine Winder / Luz Maria Zornoza
 Mixed doubles:  David Obernosterer / Elisabeth Baldauf 
 June 11 – 14: Yonex Mauritius International 2015 in Beau-Bassin Rose-Hill
 Men's singles:  Kevin Cordón
 Men's doubles:  Shlok Ramchandran / Sanyam Shukla
 Women's singles:  Nanna Vainio
 Women's doubles:  Negin Amiripour / Aghaei Hajiagha Soraya
 Mixed doubles:  Andries Malan / Jennifer Fry

July BMT

 July 1 – 5: White Nights 2015 in Gatchina
 Men's singles:  Vladimir Vadimovich Malkov
 Men's doubles:  Koo Kien Keat / Boon Heong Tan
 Women's singles:  Thi Trang Vu
 Women's doubles:  Ekaterina Bolotova / Evgeniya Kosetskaya
 Mixed doubles:  Sam Magee / Chloe Magee
 July 7 – 12: Condensate Apacs Kazakhstan International Series 2015 in Uralsk
 Men's singles:  Vladimir Vadimovich Malkov
 Men's doubles:  Ming Chuen Lim / Wei Khoon Ong 
 Women's singles:  Evgeniya Kosetskaya
 Women's doubles:  Tatjana Bibik / Ksenia Polikarpova
 Mixed doubles:  Anatoliy Yartsev / Evgeniya Kosetskaya
 July 15 – 18: Lagos International 2015 in Nigeria
 Men's singles:  Sai Praneeth B.
 Men's doubles:  Manu Attri / B. Sumeeth Reddy
 Women's singles:  Kristína Gavnholt
 Women's doubles:  Pradnya Gadre / N. Siki Reddy
 Mixed doubles:  Robert Mateusiak / Nadieżda Zięba

August BMT

 August 17 – 20: Eurasia Bulgaria International in Sofia
 Men's singles:  Raul Must
 Men's doubles:  Jordan Corvee / Julien Maio
 Women's singles:  Natalia Koch Rohde
 Women's doubles:  Thu Huyen Le / Nhu Thao Pham
 Mixed doubles:  Tuan Duc Do / Nhu Thao Pham
 August 18 – 22: OUE Singapore International Series 2015 in Singapore
 Men's singles:  Iskandar Zulkarnain Zainuddin
 Men's doubles:  Yong Kai Terry Hee / Kean Hean Loh
 Women's singles:  Gregoria Mariska Tunjung
 Women's doubles:  Apriani Apriani / Jauza Fadhila Sugiarto
 Mixed doubles:  Hafiz Faisal / Shella Devi Aulia
 August 20 – 23: I.B.B. Turkish International 2015 in Istanbul
 Men's singles:  Yuhan Tan
 Men's doubles:  Gergely Krausz /  Tovannakasem Samatcha
 Women's singles:  Kati Tolmoff
 Women's doubles:  Kader İnal / Fatma Nur Yavuz
 Mixed doubles:  Melih Turgut / Fatma Nur Yavuz

September BMT

 September 1 – 6: Victor Indonesia International Challenge 2015 in Surabaya
 Men's singles:  Sony Dwi Kuncoro
 Men's doubles:  Berry Angriawan / Rian Agung Saputro
 Women's singles:  Gregoria Mariska Tunjung
 Women's doubles:  Gebby Ristiyani Imawan / Tiara Rosalia Nuraidah
 Mixed doubles:  Fran Kurniawan / Komala Dewi
 September 2 – 6: Guatemala International Challenge 2015 in Guatemala City
 Men's singles:  Kevin Cordón
 Men's doubles:  Michael Fuchs / Johannes Schöttler
 Women's singles:  Rong Schafer
 Women's doubles:  Johanna Goliszewski / Carla Nelte
 Mixed doubles:  Michael Fuchs / Birgit Michels
 September 3 – 6: Babolat Kharkiv International 2015 in Kharkiv
 Men's singles:  Henri Hurskainen
 Men's doubles:  Bodin Issara / Nipitphon Puangpuapech
 Women's singles:  Olga Konon
 Women's doubles:  Jongkongphan Kittiharakul / Rawinda Prajongjai
 Mixed doubles:  Robert Mateusiak / Nadieżda Zięba
 September 9 – 12: Yonex Belgian International 2015 in Leuven
 Men's singles:  Anders Antonsen
 Men's doubles:  Manu Attri / B. Sumeeth Reddy
 Women's singles:  GOH Jin Wei
 Women's doubles:  Maiken Fruergaard / Sara Thygesen
 Mixed doubles:  Robert Mateusiak / Nadieżda Zięba
 September 9 – 13: VI Internacional Mexicano 2015 in Cancún
 Men's singles:  Ernesto Velazquez
 Men's doubles:  Job Castillo / Lino Munoz 
 Women's singles:  Telma Santos
 Women's doubles:  Lohaynny Vicente / Luana Vicente
 Mixed doubles:  David Obernosterer / Elisabeth Baldauf 
 September 9 – 13: Auckland International 2015
 Men's singles:  LU Chia-hung
 Men's doubles:  Darren Isaac Devadass / Vountus Indra Mawan
 Women's singles:  LEE Chia-hsin
 Women's doubles:  Setyana Mapasa / Gronya Somerville
 Mixed doubles:  LEE Chia-han / LEE Chia-hsin
 September 16 – 20: 2015 Victor Maribyrnong International in Melbourne
 Men's singles:  LU Chia-hung
 Men's doubles:  Darren Isaac Devadass / Vountus Indra Mawan
 Women's singles:  Julia Wong Pei Xian
 Women's doubles:  Setyana Mapasa / Gronya Somerville
 Mixed doubles:  Robin Middleton /  Leanne Choo
 September 17 – 20: Polish International 2015 in Bieruń
 Men's singles:  Iskandar Zulkarnain Zainuddin
 Men's doubles:  Kasper Antonsen / Niclas Nohr
 Women's singles:  Ho Yen Mei
 Women's doubles:  Clara Nistad / Emma Wengberg
 Mixed doubles:  Kasper Antonsen / Amanda Madsen
 September 22 – 26: 2015 Sydney International
 Men's singles:  Nguyễn Tiến Minh
 Men's doubles:  Jagdish Singh / Wee Long Roni Tan
 Women's singles:  Pornpawee Chochuwong
 Women's doubles:  Jongkolphan Kititharakul / Rawinda Prajongjai
 Mixed doubles:  Robin Middleton /  Leanne Choo
 September 22 – 26: Erdenet MC - Apacs International Series 2015 in Ulaanbaatar
 Men's singles:  LEE Cheol-ho
 Men's doubles:  KIM Dae-sung / KIM Young-sun
 Women's singles:  Soo Bin-lim
 Women's doubles:  KANG Ga-ae / LEE Ja-yeong
 Mixed doubles:  KIM Young-sun / LEE Ja-yeong
 September 23 – 26: FZ Forza Prague Badminton Open 2015
 Men's singles:  Marc Zwiebler
 Men's doubles:  Adam Cwalina / Przemysław Wacha
 Women's singles:  Kirsty Gilmour
 Women's doubles:  Isabel Herttrich / Birgit Michels
 Mixed doubles:  Vitalij Durkin / Nina Vislova
 September 23 – 27: VI Colombia International 2015 in Medellín
 Men's singles:  Bjorn Seguin 
 Men's doubles:  Daniel Paiola / Alex Yuwan Tjong 
 Women's singles:  Jeanine Cicognini
 Women's doubles:  Ana Paula Campos / Fabiana Silva
 Mixed doubles:  Alex Yuwan Tjong / Fabiana Silva
 September 24 – 27: Ethiopia International 2015 in Addis Ababa
 Men's singles:  Misha Zilberman
 Men's doubles:  Andries Malan / Willem Viljoen
 Women's singles:  Cemre Fere
 Women's doubles:  Cemre Fere / Ebru Yazgan
 Mixed doubles:  Ahmed Salah / Menna Eltanany
 September 30 – October 3: BABOLAT Bulgarian International 2015 in Sofia
 Men's singles:  Pablo Abián
 Men's doubles:  Raphael Beck / Peter Kaesbauer
 Women's singles:  Olga Konon
 Women's doubles:  Gabriela Stoeva / Stefani Stoeva
 Mixed doubles:  Robert Mateusiak / Nadieżda Zięba
 September 30 – October 3: Nigeria International 2015 in Abuja
 Men's singles:  Howard Shu
 Men's doubles:  Emre Vural / Sİnan Zorlu
 Women's singles:  Grace Gabriel
 Women's doubles:  Cemre Fere / Ebru Yazgan
 Mixed doubles:  Olorunfemi Elewa / Susan Ideh
 September 30 – October 4: Kawasaki Vietnam International Series 2015 in Da Nang
 Men's singles:  Krishna Adi Nugraha
 Men's doubles:  Hardianto Hardianto / Kenas Adi Haryanto
 Women's singles:  GOH Jin Wei
 Women's doubles:  Gebby Ristiyani Imawan / Tiara Rosalia Nuraidah
 Mixed doubles:  Rian Swastedian / Masita Mahmudin

October BMT

 October 7 – 11: IV Argentina International 2015 in Neuquén
 Men's singles:  Bjorn Seguin
 Men's doubles:  Job Castillo / Lino Munoz
 Women's singles:  Elisabeth Baldauf
 Women's doubles:  Haramara Gaitan / Sabrina Solis
 Mixed doubles:  David Obernosterer / Elisabeth Baldauf
 October 14 – 18: Chile International Challenge 2015 in Temuco
 Men's singles:  Pablo Abián
 Men's doubles:  Adrian Liu / Derrick Ng
 Women's singles:  Özge Bayrak
 Women's doubles:  Eva Lee / Paula Lynn Obanana
 Mixed doubles:  Phillip Chew / Jamie Subandhi
 October 15 – 18: Swiss International 2015 in Yverodn-les-Bains
 Men's singles:  Iskandar Zulkarnain Zainuddin
 Men's doubles:  Koo Kien Keat / Tan Boon Heong
 Women's singles:  Nichaon Jindapon
 Women's doubles:  Samantha Barning / Iris Tabeling
 Mixed doubles:  Robert Blair /  Pia Zebadiah Bernadeth
 October 21 – 25: 30th Brazil International Badminton Cup in São Paulo
 Men's singles:  Ygor Coelho de Oliveira 
 Men's doubles:  Job Castillo / Lino Munoz 
 Women's singles:  Laura Sarosi 
 Women's doubles:  Lohaynny Vicente / Luana Vicente
 Mixed doubles:  Hugo Arthuso / Fabiana Silva
 October 22 – 25: 2015 Morocco International in Casablanca
 Men's singles:  Pedro Martins
 Men's doubles:  Mohmed Misbun Misbun Shawal / Ridzwan Rahmat
 Women's singles:  Lianne Tan
 Women's doubles:  Ieva Pope / Kristine Sefere
 Mixed doubles:  Vincent Espen / Manon Krieger
 October 28 – 31: New Caledonia International 2015 in Nouméa
 Men's singles:  Howard Shu
 Men's doubles:  Anthony Joe / Pit Seng Low
 Women's singles:  Jeanine Cicognini
 Women's doubles:  Johanna Kou /  Maria Masinipeni
 Mixed doubles:  Shane Masinipeni / Maria Masinipeni 
 October 28 – November 1: Bahrain International Series 2015 in Isa Town
 Men's singles:  Sameer Verma
 Men's doubles:  Wee Tat Tan / Yip Jiun Tan
 Women's singles:  Li Lian Yang
 Women's doubles:  S. Poorvisha Ram / Arathi Sara Sunil 
 Mixed doubles:  Yip Jiun Tan / Li Lian Yang
 October 29 – November 1: 40th Yonex Hungarian International 2015 in Budapest
 Men's singles:  Kalle Koljonen
 Men's doubles:  Martin Campbell / Patrick Machugh
 Women's singles:  Aprilia Yuswandari
 Women's doubles:  Yee See Cheah / Kah Mun Chin 
 Mixed doubles:  Christopher Coles / Victoria Williams

November BMT

 November 3 – 7: Bahrain International Challenge 2015 in Isa Town
 Men's singles:  Sameer Verma
 Men's doubles:  Bodin Issara / Nipitphon Puangpuapech
 Women's singles:  Nichaon Jindapon
 Women's doubles:  Savitree Amitrapai / Pacharapun Chochuwong
 Mixed doubles:  Bodin Issara / Savitree Amitrapai
 November 10 – 15: MAYBANK Malaysia International Challenge 2015 in Alor Setar
 Men's singles:  Khosit Phetpradab
 Men's doubles:  Lin Chia Yu / Hsiao-Lin Wu
 Women's singles:  Xiaoyu Liang
 Women's doubles:  Della Destiara Haris / Rosyita Eka Putri Sari
 Mixed doubles:  Bodin Issara / Savitree Amitrapai
 November 11 – 15: Puerto Rico International 2015 in San Juan, Puerto Rico
 Men's singles:  Kevin Cordón
 Men's doubles:  Job Castillo / Lino Munoz
 Women's singles:  Laura Sarosi 
 Women's doubles:  Haramara Gaitan / Sabrina Solis 
 Mixed doubles:  Alex Yuwan Tjong / Lohaynny Vicente
 November 12 – 15: Norwegian International Championships 2015 in Sandefjord
 Men's singles:  Marius Myhre
 Men's doubles:  Soren Gravholt / Nikolaj Overgaard
 Women's singles:  Sofie Holmboe Dahl 
 Women's doubles:  Setyana Mapasa / Gronya Somerville
 Mixed doubles:  Sawan Serasinghe / Setyana Mapasa
 November 18 – 21: IX Suriname International 2015 in Paramaribo
 Men's singles:  Osleni Guerrero
 Men's doubles:  Job Castillo / Lino Munoz
 Women's singles:  Telma Santos
 Women's doubles:  Haramara Gaitan / Sabrina Solis
 Mixed doubles:  Jonathan Persson /  Ana Paula Campos
 November 19 – 22: Yonex Finnish International Championships 2015 in Helsinki
 Men's singles:  Steffen Rasmussen
 Men's doubles:  Nikita Khakimov / Vasily Kuznetsov
 Women's singles:  Febby Angguni
 Women's doubles:  Clara Nistad / Emma Wengberg
 Mixed doubles:  Filip Michael Duwall Myhren / Emma Wengberg
 November 25 – 28: Yonex Welsh International Badminton Championships 2015 in Cardiff
 Men's singles:  Vladimir Vadimovich Malkov
 Men's doubles:  Marcus Ellis / Chris Langridge
 Women's singles:  Anna Thea Madsen
 Women's doubles:  Gabriela Stoeva / Stefani Stoeva
 Mixed doubles:  Matthew Nottingham / Emily Westwood
 November 26 – 29: Zambia International 2015 in Lusaka
 Men's singles:  Vatannejad-Soroush Eskandari
 Men's doubles:  Andries Malan / Willem Viljoen
 Women's singles:  Kate Foo Kune
 Women's doubles:  Nadine Ashraf / Menna Eltanany
 Mixed doubles:  Abdelrahman Kashkal / Hadia Hosny

December BMT

 December 1 – 5: Bangladesh Open International Badminton Challenge 2015 in Dhaka
 Men's singles:  B. Sai Praneeth
 Men's doubles:  Pranav Chopra / Akshay Dewalkar
 Women's singles:  Gadde Ruthvika Shivani
 Women's doubles:  Chaladchalam Chayanit / Phataimas Muenwong
 Mixed doubles:  Yong Kai Terry Hee / Wei Han Tan
 December 1 – 5: YONEX USA International 2015 in Orlando, Florida
 Men's singles:  Emil Holst
 Men's doubles:  Lin Chia Yu / Hsiao-Lin Wu
 Women's singles:  Zhang Beiwen
 Women's doubles:  Heather Olver / Lauren Smith
 Mixed doubles:  Michael Fuchs / Birgit Michels
 December 2 – 5: CARLTON IRISH OPEN 2015 in Dublin
 Men's singles:  Anders Antonsen
 Men's doubles:  Raphael Beck / Peter Kaesbauer
 Women's singles:  Olga Konon
 Women's doubles:  Gabriela Stoeva / Stefani Stoeva
 Mixed doubles:  Mathias Christiansen / Lena Grebak
 December 3 – 6: South Africa International 2015 in Cape Town
 Men's singles:  Howard Shu
 Men's doubles:  Vatannejad-Soroush Eskandari / Farzin Khanjani
 Women's singles:  Telma Santos
 Women's doubles:  Cemre Fere / Ebru Yazgan
 Mixed doubles:  Andries Malan / Jennifer Fry
 December 8 – 11: YONEX Italian International 2015 in Milan
 Men's singles:  Brice Leverdez
 Men's doubles:  Kasper Antonsen / Niclas Nohr
 Women's singles:  Natalia Koch Rohde
 Women's doubles:  Gabriela Stoeva / Stefani Stoeva
 Mixed doubles:  Niclas Nohr / Sara Thygesen
 December 9 – 13: TATA India International Challenge 2015 in Mumbai
 Men's singles:  Sameer Verma
 Men's doubles:  Wannawat Ampunsuwan / Tinn Isriyanate
 Women's singles:  Pornpawee Chochuwong
 Women's doubles:  Chaladchalam Chayanit / Phataimas Muenwong
 Mixed doubles:  Satwiksairaj Rankireddy / K. Maneesha
 December 10 – 13: Botswana International 2015 in Gaborone
 Men's singles:  Howard Shu
 Men's doubles:  Andries Malan / Willem Viljoen
 Women's singles:  Laura Sarosi 
 Women's doubles:  Grace Gabriel /  Ogar Siamupangila
 Mixed doubles:  Abdelrahman Kashkal / Hadia Hosny
 December 17 – 20: Mersin Turkey International 2015 in Mersin
 Men's singles:  Marc Zwiebler
 Men's doubles:  Kasper Antonsen / Niclas Nohr
 Women's singles:  Karin Schnaase
 Women's doubles:  Gabriela Stoeva / Stefani Stoeva
 Mixed doubles:  Robert Mateusiak / Nadieżda Zięba

References

 
Badminton by year